Imagine Schools is a charter management organization in the United States, operating 55 schools in 9 states. They are K-8, for the most part. In 2015, Imagine schools had enrolled 29,812 students.

Imagine Schools was founded by Dennis and Eileen Bakke with $155 million of the fortune Dennis had earned as chief executive officer of AES Corporation, a global energy provider which he co-founded in 1981.

History
Beacon Education Management was founded in 1996. By 2008, Imagine had grown to 56 schools. 

In 2015, Imagine Schools was ordered to pay a $1 million judgment as part of a self-dealing scheme. As part of a complex arrangement, Imagine Schools had negotiated above market rents for its facilities, which it actually owned through a subsidiary.

Peer group
In 2015, Imagine adopted non-profit tax status. Similar organizations are known as charter management organizations (CMOs). Other large non-profits are KIPP (209 schools) and Cosmos.

Similar services are provided by for-profit entities known as education management organizations (EMOs). K12 was the largest in the US in 2011–2012. K12 does not manage any brick-and-mortar schools, instead delivering schooling on line.

References

Charter management organizations
American companies established in 1996